The Crisis of Man (original title in French: “La Crise de l’homme”) was a lecture delivered by Nobel Prize–winning author Albert Camus at Columbia University on March 28, 1946. The lecture was focused on the moral decline of humanity and on how to promote peace.

The lecture was re-delivered 70 years later, at the same amphitheater, narrated by actor Viggo Mortensen.

References

External links
Albert Camus's “The Human Crisis” read by Viggo Mortensen, 70 years later

Albert Camus